Esteban Masson (born 18 September 2004) is a Canadian-French racing driver who is the 2021 French F4 champion and currently drives in the Formula Regional European Championship with FA Racing.

Career

Karting 
Having been born in Canada, Masson discovered karting at the age of three. He started winning titles after moving to France, with regional and national championships in the categories mini-kart, Minimes and Cadets. In 2018 Masson took the National Series Karting title and followed it up the following year by winning the French Junior Championship. Masson continued karting in 2020, finishing fifth in the IAME Euro Series.

Formula 4

2019 
Masson made his single-seater debut in the final round of the 2019 French F4 Championship. He finished all three races at the Paul Ricard Circuit outside of the top ten, with a best result of eleventh in race 3.

2020 
The following year Masson again raced solely in the last round of French F4 at Le Castellet. This time his results would improve, as he ended two races in points-paying positions. However, due to his status as a guest driver, Masson didn't receive any championship points.

2021 
Masson joined the French F4 Championship on a full-time basis for the first time in 2021. The Frenchman started his campaign out in brilliant fashion, winning the opening race at Nogaro and taking an early championship lead after three successive victories, two in Magny-Cours and one at the Hungaroring. However, two comparatively weak rounds at Lédenon and Monza threw Masson back behind his closest rival Macéo Capietto, who had scored four podiums from those rounds compared to Masson's one. The latter would get back to winning ways in the penultimate round in Le Castellet, and took another win in the first race of the final round in Nevers. The final race threw up controversy in the title fight: having taken pole position Masson remained in the lead of the race and the standings until the last lap, when Capietto, who was trying to make a last-gasp overtake for the lead, collided with Masson, putting him out of the race and provisionally handing Capietto the title. Following an investigation by the race stewards Capietto was disqualified from all results of that weekend, handing Masson the title.

Formula Regional

2022 
For the 2022 season Masson progressed to the Formula Regional European Championship as one of the French Federation of Automobile Sport's five Équipe de France representatives. He joined two-time Formula One World Champion Fernando Alonso's team, FA Racing, alongside Victor Bernier and Nicolás Baptiste. At the Zandvoort Circuit Masson collided with Pietro Delli Guanti approaching turn two, sending the Italian into a roll. Fortunately however, both drivers exited the scene uninjured and neither were given a penalty by the race stewards.

Before the round at Spa-Francorchamps, it was announced that Masson would switch to ART Grand Prix, replacing Mari Boya.

Racing record

Racing career summary 

† As Masson was a guest driver, he was ineligible to score points.
* Season still in progress.

Complete French F4 Championship results 
(key) (Races in bold indicate pole position) (Races in italics indicate fastest lap)

† As Masson was a guest driver, he was ineligible to score points.

Complete Formula Regional European Championship results 
(key) (Races in bold indicate pole position) (Races in italics indicate fastest lap)

* Season still in progress.

References

External links 
 

2004 births
Living people
Canadian racing drivers
French racing drivers
French F4 Championship drivers
Formula Regional European Championship drivers
FA Racing drivers
MP Motorsport drivers
FIA Motorsport Games drivers
ART Grand Prix drivers
Sportspeople from Montreal